Samuel Ablade Kumah (born 26 June 1970) is a football player from Ghana, who was a member of the Men's National Team that won the bronze medal at the 1992 Summer Olympics in Barcelona, Spain.

Club football
Ablade Kumah played most of his club football in Ghana with Accra Hearts of Oak SC between 1987 and 1993. He played as a midfielder.

International football
Ablade Kumah was a member of the Ghana football team at the 1992 Barcelona Olympics where they won the bronze medal.

References

External links
 
 
 
 
 

1970 births
Living people
Place of birth missing (living people)
Ghanaian footballers
Association football midfielders
Al-Shabab FC (Riyadh) players
Ittihad FC players
Saudi Professional League players
Ghana international footballers
Olympic footballers of Ghana
Medalists at the 1992 Summer Olympics
Olympic bronze medalists for Ghana
Olympic medalists in football
Footballers at the 1992 Summer Olympics
1996 African Cup of Nations players
Ghanaian expatriate footballers
Ghanaian expatriate sportspeople in Saudi Arabia
Expatriate footballers in Saudi Arabia